English America could refer to:
Anglo-America, parts of the Americas where English is spoken.
British America, parts of the Americas that were ruled by England and later the United Kingdom.